A non-integer representation uses non-integer numbers as the radix, or base, of a positional numeral system. For a non-integer radix β > 1, the value of

is

The numbers di are non-negative integers less than β. Every real number has at least one (possibly infinite) β-expansion. The set of all β-expansions that have a finite representation is a subset of the ring Z[β, β−1].

There are applications of β-expansions in coding theory  and models of quasicrystals.

Construction
β-expansions are a generalization of decimal expansions. While infinite decimal expansions are not unique (for example, 1.000... = 0.999...), all finite decimal expansions are unique. However, even finite β-expansions are not necessarily unique, for example φ + 1 = φ2 for β = φ, the golden ratio.

Let  be the base and x a non-negative real number.  Denote by  the floor function of x (that is, the greatest integer less than or equal to x) and let  be the fractional part of x. There exists an integer k such that . Set

and

For , put

In other words, the canonical β-expansion of x is defined by choosing the largest dk such that , then choosing the largest dk−1 such that , and so on. Thus it chooses the lexicographically largest string representing x.

With an integer base, this defines the usual radix expansion for the number x.  This construction extends the usual algorithm to possibly non-integer values of β.

Conversion 

The first  values of  appear to the left of the decimal place.

This can also be written in the following pseudocode: 
function toBase(n, b) {
	k = floor(log(b, n)) + 1
	precision = 8
	result = ""

	for (i = k - 1, i > -precision-1, i--) {
		if (result.length == k) result += "."
		
		digit = floor((n / b^i) mod b)
		n -= digit * b^i
		result += digit
	}

	return result
}

Example implementation code

To base  
 JavaScript:function toBasePI(num, precision = 8) {    
    let k = Math.floor(Math.log(num)/Math.log(Math.PI)) + 1;
    if (k < 0) k = 0;

    let digits = [];

    for (let i = k-1; i > (-1*precision)-1; i--) {
        let digit = Math.floor((num / Math.pow(Math.PI, i)) % Math.PI);
        num -= digit * Math.pow(Math.PI, i);
        digits.push(digit);

        if (num <= 0)
            break;
    }

    if (digits.length > k)
        digits.splice(k, 0, ".");

    return digits.join("");
}

From base  
 JavaScript:function fromBasePI(num) {
    let numberSplit = num.split(/\./g);
    let numberLength = numberSplit[0].length;

    let output = 0;
    let digits = numberSplit.join("");

    for (let i = 0; i < digits.length; i++) {
        output += digits[i] * Math.pow(Math.PI, numberLength-i-1);
    }

    return output;
}

Examples

Base 
Base  behaves in a very similar way to base 2 as all one has to do to convert a number from binary into base  is put a zero digit in between every binary digit; for example, 191110 = 111011101112 becomes 101010001010100010101 and 511810 = 10011111111102 becomes 1000001010101010101010100. This means that every integer can be expressed in base  without the need of a decimal point. The base can also be used to show the relationship between the side of a square to its diagonal as a square with a side length of 1 will have a diagonal of 10 and a square with a side length of 10 will have a diagonal of 100. Another use of the base is to show the silver ratio as its representation in base  is simply 11. In addition, the area of a regular octagon with side length 1 is 1100, the area of a regular octagon with side length 10 is 110000, the area of a regular octagon with side length 100 is 11000000, etc…

Golden base 

In the golden base, some numbers have more than one decimal base equivalent: they are ambiguous. For example:
11φ = 100φ.

Base ψ
There are also some numbers in base ψ are also ambiguous. For example, 101ψ = 1000ψ.

Base e
With base e the natural logarithm behaves like the common logarithm as ln(1e) = 0, ln(10e) = 1, ln(100e) = 2 and ln(1000e) = 3.

The base e is the most economical choice of radix β > 1 , where the radix economy is measured as the product of the radix and the length of the string of symbols needed to express a given range of values.

Base π
Base π can be used to more easily show the relationship between the diameter of a circle to its circumference, which  corresponds to its perimeter; since circumference = diameter × π, a circle with a diameter 1π will have a circumference of 10π, a circle with a diameter 10π will have a circumference of 100π, etc. Furthermore, since the area = π × radius2, a circle with a radius of 1π will have an area of 10π, a circle with a radius of 10π will have an area of 1000π and a circle with a radius of 100π will have an area of 100000π.

Properties 
In no positional number system can every number be expressed uniquely.  For example, in base ten, the number 1 has two representations: 1.000... and 0.999....  The set of numbers with two different representations is dense in the reals , but the question of classifying real numbers with unique β-expansions is considerably more subtle than that of integer bases .

Another problem is to classify the real numbers whose β-expansions are periodic.  Let β > 1, and Q(β) be the smallest field extension of the rationals containing β.  Then any real number in [0,1) having a periodic β-expansion must lie in Q(β).  On the other hand, the converse need not be true.  The converse does hold if β is a Pisot number , although necessary and sufficient conditions are not known.

See also 
 Beta encoder
 Non-standard positional numeral systems
 Decimal expansion
 Power series
 Ostrowski numeration

References 

.
.
.
.
.
.
.
.
.

Further reading

External links
 

Number theory
Ring theory
Coding theory
Non-standard positional numeral systems